The Apalachicola snapping turtle (Macrochelys apalachicolae) is a proposed species that lives in the Apalachicola River, United States.  The species can as well be found within other panhandle rivers within the states of Florida, Georgia, and Alabama. It has traditionally been included as part of the widespread species M. temminckii, but an analysis in 2014 recommended treating it as distinct. A study published the following year considered this change unwarranted and recommended that M. apalachicolae should be considered a junior synonym of M. temminckii, and this is followed by the Reptile Database, IUCN's Tortoise and Freshwater Turtle Specialist Group, and the Committee On Standard English And Scientific Names (Society for the Study of Amphibians and Reptiles). The Apalachicola snapping turtles and other species of snapping turtle have been classified as endangered due to human activity which is causing the destruction to their natural habitats

References

Chelydridae
Reptiles of the United States
Aquatic reptiles
Reptiles described in 2014